Merolyn Sali (born 30 October 1998) is a Papua New Guinean footballer who plays as a defender. She has been a member of the Papua New Guinea women's national team.

Notes

References

1998 births
Living people
Women's association football defenders
Papua New Guinean women's footballers
Papua New Guinea women's international footballers